The Institut de rythmique Jaques-Dalcroze de Belgique is a music education institute based in Brussels, Belgium. It exists from the beginning of the 1950s. In 1975, the French Community of Belgium recognized it as a National Institution of Musical Education. It is located in the Clinique du Docteur Van Neck building, an Art Nouveau work built in 1910 by Antoine Pompe.

Educational method
The institute uses pedagogue Emile Jaques-Dalcroze's educational method, whose centre is based at the Jaques-Dalcroze Institute in Geneva. The Dalcroze Eurhythmics method starts with the idea that the first instrument one has is the body. The learning of artistic expression must therefore begin with this instrument. Since 1975, the Dalcroze Institute of Belgium has been dedicated to exploring multidisciplinary artistic training, combining, through rhythm and improvisation, the study of music, body expression, movement, and circus arts.

International Federation of Eurhythmics Teachers
Dalcroze Eurhythmics is taught all over the world. Its teachers have founded the International Federation of Eurhythmics Teachers (FIER - Fédération Internationale des Enseignants de Rythmique), based in Geneva.

Notable instructors and directors
 Pierre Kolp
 Stéphane Ginsburgh
 André Ristic
 Juan Carlos Tolosa

External links
 Official website
 Geneva Institute website
 International Federation of Eurhythmics Teachers website

Music schools in Belgium
Dalcroze Eurhythmics